The following lists events that happened during 1960 in Cape Verde.

Incumbents
Colonial governor: Silvino Silvério Marques

Events
Population: 199,743
São Pedro Airport (now Cesária Évora Airport) opened as the country's second airport
December 10: Praia National Lyceum (Liceu Nacional da Praia) was established, today known as Liceu Domingos Ramos

Sports
CS Mindelense won the Cape Verdean Football Championship

Arts and entertainment
December: Claridade review ceased publication after fourteen years of existence

References

 
1960 in the Portuguese Empire
Years of the 20th century in Cape Verde
1960s in Cape Verde
Cape Verde
Cape Verde